Ronny Clyde Aloema (born 18 October 1979) is a Surinamese footballer, who plays as a goalkeeper. He currently plays for S.V. Robinhood at the club level, and for Suriname at the international level.

Biography

Domestic career
Aloema played for SV Voorwaarts between 2002 and 2006, before signing for SV Transvaal in 2007. He signed for Trinidadian TT Pro League club Tobago United in 2009, but returned to SV Transvaal the following year. In 2011, he moved to S.V. Robinhood.

International career
Aloema made his debut for Suriname in 2008. His last appearance to date was a 2012 Caribbean Cup qualifying match against St Vincent & the Grenadines. In addition to his 24 FIFA-recognised caps, Aloema played in three unofficial matches. Despite being a goalkeeper, he took penalty kicks for the national team, scoring twice in official matches and twice in unofficial matches.

Aloema has also played for the Suriname national futsal team.

After his football career Aloema has started a career in music. He is also a political member of the VHP.

International goals

NoteBonaire and Martinique aren't affiliated to FIFA, but they are CONCACAF members.

References

1979 births
Futsal goalkeepers
Association football goalkeepers
Surinamese footballers
Surinamese men's futsal players
Suriname international footballers
S.V. Robinhood players
S.V. Transvaal players
S.V. Voorwaarts players
S.V. Walking Boyz Company players
Surinamese expatriate footballers
Expatriate footballers in Trinidad and Tobago
Tobago United F.C. players
SVB Eerste Divisie players
TT Pro League players
Living people
Surinamese expatriate sportspeople in Trinidad and Tobago